Kim Stanley Robinson (born March 23, 1952) is an American writer of science fiction. He has published twenty-two novels and numerous short stories and is best known for his Mars trilogy. His work has been translated into 24 languages. Many of his novels and stories have ecological, cultural, and political themes and feature scientists as heroes. Robinson has won numerous awards, including the Hugo Award for Best Novel, the Nebula Award for Best Novel and the World Fantasy Award. Robinson's work has been labeled by The Atlantic as "the gold-standard of realistic, and highly literary, science-fiction writing." According to an article in The New Yorker, Robinson is "generally acknowledged as one of the greatest living science-fiction writers."

Early life and education
Robinson was born in Waukegan, Illinois. He moved to Southern California as a child.

In 1974, he earned a B.A. in literature from the University of California, San Diego. In 1975, he earned an M.A. in English from Boston University. In 1978 Robinson moved to Davis, California, to take a break from his graduate studies at the University of California, San Diego (UC San Diego). During this time, he worked as a bookseller for Orpheus Books. He also taught freshman composition and other courses at University of California, Davis.

In 1982, Robinson earned a PhD in English from UC San Diego. His initial PhD advisor was literary critic and Marxist scholar Fredric Jameson, who told Robinson to read works by Philip K. Dick. Jameson described Dick to Robinson as "the greatest living American writer". Robinson's doctoral thesis, The Novels of Philip K. Dick, was published in 1984 and a hardcover version was published by UMI Research Press.

Career
In 2009, Robinson was an instructor at the Clarion Workshop. In 2010, he was the guest of honor at the 68th World Science Fiction Convention, held in Melbourne. In April 2011, Robinson presented at the second annual Rethinking Capitalism conference, held at the University of California, Santa Cruz. Among other points made, his talk addressed the cyclical nature of capitalism.

Robinson was appointed as a Muir Environmental Fellow in 2011 by John Muir College at UC San Diego.

Major themes

Nature and culture
Sheldon Brown described Robinson's novels as ways to explore how nature and culture continuously reformulate one another; Three Californias Trilogy as California in the future; Washington DC undergoing the impact of climate change in the Science in the Capital series; or Mars as a stand-in for Earth in the Mars trilogy to think about re-engineering on a global scale, both social and natural conditions.

Ecological sustainability
Virtually all of Robinson's novels have an ecological component; sustainability is one of his primary themes (a strong contender for the primary theme would be the nature of a plausible utopia). The Orange County trilogy is about the way in which the technological intersects with the natural, highlighting the importance of keeping the two in balance. In the Mars trilogy, one of the principal divisions among the population of Mars is based on dissenting views on terraforming. Colonists debate whether or not the barren Martian landscape has a similar ecological or spiritual value when compared with a living ecosphere like Earth's. Forty Signs of Rain has an entirely ecological thrust, taking global warming as its principal subject.

Economic and social justice

Robinson's work often explores alternatives to modern capitalism. In the Mars trilogy, it is argued that capitalism is an outgrowth of feudalism, which could be replaced in the future by a more democratic economic system. Worker ownership and cooperatives figure prominently in Green Mars and Blue Mars as replacements for traditional corporations. The Orange County trilogy explores similar arrangements; Pacific Edge includes the idea of attacking the legal framework behind corporate domination to promote social egalitarianism. Tim Kreider writes in the New Yorker that Robinson may be our greatest political novelist and describes how Robinson uses the Mars trilogy as a template for a credible utopia. His works have made reference to real-world examples of economic organization that have been cited as examples of alternatives to conventional capitalist structures, such as the Mondragon Corporation and the Kerala model.

Robinson's writing also reflects an interest in economic models that reject the growth-oriented basis of capitalism: Robert Markley has identified the work of Murray Bookchin as an influence on his thinking, as well as steady-state economics.

Robinson's work often portrays characters struggling to preserve and enhance the world around them in an environment characterized by individualism and entrepreneurialism, often facing the political and economic authoritarianism of corporate power acting in this environment. Robinson has been described as anti-capitalist, and his work often portrays a form of frontier capitalism that promotes egalitarian ideals that closely resemble socialist systems, but faced with a capitalism that is maintained by entrenched hegemonic corporations. In particular, his Martian Constitution draws upon social democratic ideals explicitly emphasizing a community-participation element in political and economic life.

Robinson's works often portray the worlds of tomorrow in a manner similar to the mythologized American Western frontier, showing a sentimental affection for the freedom and wildness of the frontier. This aesthetic includes a preoccupation with competing models of political and economic organization.

The environmental, economic, and social themes in Robinson's oeuvre stand in marked contrast to the right-libertarian science fiction prevalent in much of the genre (Robert A. Heinlein, Poul Anderson, Larry Niven, and Jerry Pournelle being prominent examples). He has been described as "one of America's best-selling […] left-wing novelists" and his work has been called "probably the most successful attempt to reach a mass audience with an anti-capitalist utopian vision since Ursula K. Le Guin's 1974 novel, The Dispossessed".

Scientists as heroes
Robinson's work often features scientists as heroes. They are portrayed in a mundane way compared to most work featuring scientists: rather than being adventurers or action heroes, Robinson's scientists become critically important because of research discoveries, networking and collaboration with other scientists, political lobbying, or becoming public figures. Robinson captures the joy of scientists as they work at something they care about. Robert Markley has argued that Robinson "views science as the model for a utopian politics... Even in Robinson’s novels that don’t seem to be sci-fi, like Shaman, the inductive method, the collective search for greater knowledge about the world that can be put to use for the good for all, is front and center". The Mars trilogy and The Years of Rice and Salt rely heavily on the idea that scientists must take responsibility for ensuring public understanding and responsible use of their discoveries. Robinson's scientists often emerge as the best people to direct public policy on important environmental and technological questions, of which politicians are often ignorant.

Climate change and global warming

Related to Robinson's focus on the environment are his themes of the imminent catastrophe of global warming and the need to limit greenhouse gas emissions in the present day. His 2012 novel 2312 explores the detrimental, long-term effects of climate change, which include food shortages, global instability, mass extinction, and  sea level rise that has drowned many major coastal cities. The novel condemns the people of the period it calls "the Dithering", from 2005 to 2060, for failing to address climate change and thereby causing mass suffering and death in the future. Robinson and his work accuse global capitalism for the failure to address climate change. In his 2017 novel New York 2140 Robinson explores the themes of climate change and global warming, setting the novel in the year 2140 when the New York City he imagines is beset by a  sea level rise that submerges half of the city. Climate change is also the focus of his Science in the Capital series and his 2020 novel The Ministry for the Future.

Awards and honors
Asteroid 72432 Kimrobinson discovered by astronomer Donald P. Pray in 2001, was named in his honor. The official  was published by the Minor Planet Center on April 22, 2016.

In 2008, Time magazine named Robinson a "Hero of the Environment" for his optimistic focus on the future.

Personal life
Robinson and his wife have two sons. Robinson has lived in Washington, D.C., California, and during some of the 1980s, in Switzerland. At times, Robinson was a stay-at-home dad. He later moved to Davis, California, in a cohousing community.

Robinson has described himself as an avid backpacker with the Sierra Nevada serving as his home range and a big influence on how he sees the world.

Politically, Robinson identifies as a democratic socialist, and in a February 2019 interview mentioned he is a dues-paying member of the Democratic Socialists of America. He has also remarked that libertarianism has never "[made] any sense to me, nor sounds attractive as a principle."

Works

References

External links

 
 KimStanleyRobinson.info – unofficial site
 Short descriptions of K.S. Robinson's novels
 All of Kim Stanley Robinson's audio interviews on the podcast The Future And You (in which he describes his expectations of the future)
  
 Guardian interview with K.S. Robinson (Wednesday September 14, 2005)
 "Comparative Planetology: an Interview with Kim Stanley Robinson" at BLDGBLOG
 Complete list of sci-fi award wins and nominations by novel
 Interview on the SciFiDimensions Podcast (original webpage down; link to archive.org version of page.)
 "Terraforming Earth", essay by KSR at Slate, December 4, 2012
 
 Worldwatch Institute State of the World – Kim Stanley Robinson, 04/16/2013 Washington, DC
 Kim Stanley Robinson discusses Marxism, scientism and bureaucrats with The Dig podcast.

1952 births
20th-century American male writers
20th-century American novelists
21st-century American male writers
21st-century American novelists
American alternate history writers
American democratic socialists
American humanists
American male novelists
American science fiction writers
American social commentators
Boston University College of Arts and Sciences alumni
Environmental fiction writers
Hugo Award-winning writers
Members of the Democratic Socialists of America
Nebula Award winners
Novelists from California
Novelists from Illinois
Living people
People from Davis, California
People from Waukegan, Illinois
Philosophers of culture
Philosophers of history
Philosophers of science
Philosophers of technology
Social philosophers
University of California, San Diego alumni
World Fantasy Award-winning writers
Writers of historical fiction set in the modern age
Writers of historical fiction set in the Middle Ages
Writers of historical fiction set in the early modern period